Rajpur Farhadwa (Nepali: राजपुर) is a municipality in Rautahat District, a part of Madhesh Province in Nepal. It was formed in 2016 occupying current 9 sections (wards) from previous 9 former VDCs. It occupies an area of 31.41 km2 with a total population of 41,136 as of 2011.

References

Populated places in Rautahat District
Nepal municipalities established in 2017
Municipalities in Madhesh Province